Maschinenfabrik Esslingen (ME), was a German engineering firm that manufactured locomotives, tramways, railway wagons, roll-blocks, technical equipment for the railways, (turntables and traversers), bridges, steel structures, pumps and boilers.

Founding
It was founded by Emil Kessler on 11 March 1846 in Stuttgart, as a result of an initiative of the Kingdom of Württemberg to create a railway industry that was not dependent on foreign manufacturers. Emil Kessler brought vital experience from his time with the engineering works in Karlsruhe, where he had been a member of the board since 1837 and the sole director since 1842.

The foundation stone of the new factory was laid at Esslingen am Neckar on 4 May 1846. One year later, in October 1847, the first locomotive ordered by the Royal Württemberg State Railways (Königlich Württembergische Staats-Eisenbahnen) or K.W.St. E. was delivered.

History

After the death of Emil Kessler in 1867 his 26-year-old son, Emil Kessler, took over the factory. He ran it until his death in 1895. From 1907 another Kessler took the helm of the engineering works: Emil Kessler's youngest son, Ludwig Kessler. Later (but prior to his death in 1931), the director was Julius Rosenthal.

The one thousandth locomotive delivered in 1870 was given the name KESSLER to commemorate the founder of the factory. The engineering works worked closely with the Royal Württemberg State Railways so that almost all new engines for the railway company were built at Esslingen.

The firm earned a very good reputation, initially at home, then increasingly abroad. Several takeovers of other companies (Maschinenfabrik Gebr. Decker & Co. in 1881, Maschinen- & Kesselfabrik G. Kuhn in 1902), the formation of Costruzioni Meccaniche Saronno (Italy) in 1887 and in 1913 the construction of a new factory at Mettingen demonstrated its success.

Ships
One phase was the construction of ships for inland waters at Ulm and Friedrichshafen, begun in 1852 and stopped by 1858, that saw it through the time of economic crisis after 1848. 50 boats for the river Danube, two steamships for the river Neckar, two steamers and two tugs for Lake Constance and were the result of this thoroughly successful venture.

Steelwork
Longer-lived was the firms involvement in steel structures and bridging, that it continued with until the end.

Locomotives
Steam
By the 1960s Maschinenfabrik Esslingen had delivered several thousand steam and diesel locomotives worldwide, including numerous special designs. It had a particular reputation for the construction of cog locomotives in many variations, including locomotives for Riggenbach, Abt and Strub rack railways. It was one of these engines that was the last steam locomotive to be made in Esslingen: on 21 October 1966 the last cog locomotive left the factory bound for Indonesia.

Electric
The company was also involved in the production of electric locomotives, for example, in 1912 for the Wendelsteinbahn. After 1920 a batch of accumulator cars was produced, mainly for coal mines and industrial railways.

Internal combustion
In addition, internal combustion engined locomotives were built, such as the small diesel locomotive, the Köf, the Esslingen railbus and the Russian locomotive class E el-2.

Trams
Between 1956 and 1965, over 400 Class SSB GT4 articulated four axle trams were built in Esslingen for the Stuttgart tramways, which were in regular operation until 2007. The same model was also built for Freiburg im Breisgau, Neunkirchen, and Reutlingen.  In addition, four axle bogie trams were built of the END system.

Even the cable car vehicles in Stuttgart were made at Esslingen.

Demise of Locomotive Construction

Finally the ME became a subsidiary of the Gutehoffnungshütte. In 1965 Daimler-Benz AG bought the company in order to use it factory facilities for its production and the construction of railway vehicles ceased. As of 2007 Maschinenfabrik Esslingen AG still existed, but as a real estate leasing company.

Preservation of Locomotives

Today, old locomotives are rebuilt by the Verein zur Erhaltung der Lokomotiven der ME (Society for the Preservation of ME Locomotives) and handed over to museum railways for everyday operations. This society has its base in the old board rooms of the engineering works in Emil-Kessler-Straße in Mettingen on the factory site of Daimler AG.

Literature 
 Max Mayer: Lokomotiven, Wagen und Bergbahnen – Geschichtliche Entwicklung in der Maschinenfabrik Eßlingen seit dem Jahre 1846. VDI-Verlag, Berlin 1924.
 Catalogue of the Exhibition Emil Kessler 1813–1867. Exhibition in the Baden State Library, Karlsruhe from 4 November to 2 December 1967, Deutsche Gesellschaft für Eisenbahngeschichte, 1967.
 Wolfgang Messerschmidt: Lokomotiven der Maschinenfabrik Esslingen 1841 bis 1966. Steiger-Verlag, Moers 1984.
 Wolfgang Messerschmidt: Von Lok zu Lok. Esslingen und der Lokomotivbau für die Bahnen der Welt. Franckh´sche Verlagshandlung, Stuttgart 1969.
 Werner Willhaus: Maschinenfabrik Esslingen., Eisenbahn-Kurier Verlag, Freiburg 1999.
 Ludwig Keßler: Aus den Anfängen der Maschinenfabrik Eßlingen. Emil Keßler – sein Leben, sein Werk. Erinnerungsschrift zur 125. Wiederkehr des Geburtstags von Emil Keßler, 1938.

External links 
 Maschinenfabrik Esslingen
 Railway nostalgia site 
 History of the ME in editions 2001 and 2002 of the Härtsfeldbahn-Anzeigers magazine
 Förderverein ME

References 

Mercedes-Benz Group
Transport in Baden-Württemberg
Defunct locomotive manufacturers of Germany